This is a list of some protected areas of Samoa which include national parks, reservations, protected nature zones, marine reserves and other areas of significant biodiversity and conservation.

In 1994, Samoa ratified the international and legally binding treaty, the Convention on Biological Diversity to develop national strategies for conservation and sustainable use of biological diversity. In 2010, protected areas in the country cover 5% of land although the government aims to increase protected areas coverage to 15%.

Areas
Aleipata Islands
Aleipata Marine Protected Area
Central Savai'i Rainforest, largest patch of continuous rainforest in Polynesia
Fagaloa Bay – Uafato Tiavea Conservation Zone
Falealupo, rainforest reserve, created by village covenant
Safata Marine Protected Area
Tafua, rainforest reserve, created village covenant

National parks
 Lake Lanoto'o National Park
 Lata National Park
 Masamasa-Falelima National Park / Cornwall National Park
 Mauga o Salafai National Park
 O Le Pupu-Puʿe National Park

Reserves
Vailele Reserve, also known as 'Ao o le Malo Reserve
Apia Central Reserve
Fa'avaeileatua Reserve
Fuluasou Botanical Garden
Magiagi Reserve
Palolo Deep Marine Reserve
Taumeasina Reserve
Tusitala Historic and Nature Reserve, located at Mount Vaea
Vaigaga Reserve
Vaimoso Reserve
Vaitele East Reserve
Vaitele West Reserve

See also
Samoan plant names
List of birds of Samoa
List of mammals of Samoa

References

Notes
Ministry of Natural Resources & Environment, Government of Samoa
Samoa Biodiversity Profile - International Treaty, Convention on Biological Diversity

Protected areas of Samoa
Nature conservation in Samoa
Protect areas
Samoa
Protected areas